= Optics & Laser Technology =

Scientific journal

- Discipline: Optics, laser science
- Language: English
- Edited by: M. Schmidt

Publication details
- Former name: Optics Technology (1968—1970)
- History: 1968—present
- Publisher: Elsevier
- Frequency: Monthly
- Impact factor: 5 (2024)

Standard abbreviations
- ISO 4: Opt. Laser Technol.

Indexing
- CODEN: OLTCAS
- ISSN: 0030-3992 (print); 1879-2545 (web)

Links
- Journal homepage; Online access; Online archive

Optics & Laser Technology is a peer-reviewed scientific journal published by Elsevier. It covers research on optics, laser science and photonics. It was established in 1968 under the name Optics Technology, being named to its current title in 1971. Its current editor-in-chief is M. Schmidt (University of Erlangen–Nuremberg).

== Abstracting and indexing ==
The journal is abstracted and indexed in:

- Current Contents/Electronics & Telecommunications Collection
- Current Contents/Engineering, Computing & Technology
- Current Contents/Physical, Chemical & Earth Sciences
- EBSCO databases
- Ei Compendex
- Science Citation Index Expanded
- Scopus

According to the Journal Citation Reports, the journal has a 2024 impact factor of 5.
